The Henry M. Jackson Hydroelectric Project, or Jackson Hydro Project, is an electric power generating project on the Sultan River operated and maintained by the Snohomish County Public Utility District in Washington, co-licensed by the city of Everett, Washington. Beginning operations in 1984, the project aims to bring clean and renewable hydropower to Snohomish county. The facility consists of a single powerhouse, two main generating units, a switch-yard, and transmission lines—all of which are directly connected to the county's local 115 kV power-transmission network. The largest generating station operated by the Snohomish county PUD, the Jackson Hydro powerhouse has a total nameplate capacity of 112 megawatts, enough to power 53,200 homes, and accounts for 7 percent of the Snohomish county PUD's total power needs. The vast remainder of the Snohomish county PUD's power comes from the Chief Joseph Dam, located in eastern Washington, through long-term contracts with the Bonneville Power Administration.

Construction
The Jackson Hydroelectric Project was constructed in two phases, the first of which was completed in 1965 with the construction of the Culmback Dam, creating Spada lake—the water supply for the Jackson Hydro Project. The second phase was completed in 1984, when the Culmback dam was raised an additional 62 feet, quadrupling the water capacity of Spada lake. The Spada lake reservoir currently covers 1,870 acres, with a maximum normal elevation of 1,450 feet. The majority of Spada lake's shores are accessible through hike-in access only.

See also
 Culmback Dam

References

Dams in Washington (state)
Hydroelectric power plants in Washington (state)
Buildings and structures in Snohomish County, Washington